Mannavan Vanthaanadi is a 1975 Indian Tamil-language film, directed by P. Madhavan. The film stars Sivaji Ganesan and Manjula. It was released on 1 August 1975.  The film become a hit at the box-office, running for over 100 days in all over Tamilnadu.

Plot

Cast 
Sivaji Ganesan as Dharmaraja/Thirumalai/Chandaramohan
Manjula as Prema
Jayasudha as Latha
M. N. Nambiar as Punniyakodi
Sukumari as Parvathi
Nagesh as Thalapathy/C.I.D. Sivanandam
S. N. Lakshmi as Grandmother
K. Vijayan as Muthumanickam/D. G. P Palanivel
Senthamarai as Police Inspector
Premanand as Sekar
Kallapart Natarajan as Mesthiri Ramu
Veeraraghavan as Dr. Dharmalingam
Haalam as Dancer

Soundtrack 
The music was composed by M. S. Viswanathan.

Release and reception 
Mannavan Vanthaanadi was released on 2 August 1975. The magazine Thiraivanam positively reviewed the film, giving it the label "Tharamaana padam" (classy film). Kanthan of Kalki called the story ordinary, but appreciated the dialogues.

References

External links 
 

1970s Tamil-language films
1975 films
Films scored by M. S. Viswanathan
Films directed by P. Madhavan